Tyreece Anthony Tupac Shakur Campbell (born 14 September 2003) is an English professional footballer who plays as a midfielder for League One club Charlton Athletic.

Career

Charlton Athletic
Coming through the youth system, Campbell signed his first professional contract with Charlton Athletic on 21 July 2021.

He made his professional debut for Charlton in a 4–0 League One defeat at home to Oxford United on 19 February 2022.

Campbell made his first professional start for Charlton – playing the opening 62 minutes – in a 1–0 League One victory away at Shrewsbury Town on 22 October 2022.

Campbell scored his first senior goal for Charlton in the 19th minute of their 2-0 victory at home to Barnsley at The Valley in League One on January 14, 2023.

Personal life
Born in England, Campbell is of Jamaican descent. His middle name is a nod to the American rapper Tupac Shakur, who died the day before he was born and who his parents were big fans of.

Career statistics

References

External links
 
 

2003 births
Living people
Footballers from Lambeth
English footballers
English sportspeople of Jamaican descent
Charlton Athletic F.C. players
Association football midfielders
English Football League players